Kisama Heritage Village (also Naga Heritage Village) is a Heritage Village located on the slopes of a hill between Kigwema and Phesama Villages in the Kohima District of the Indian state of Nagaland. The Heritage Village is the venue of the annual Hornbill Festival.

The Heritage Village houses the morungs of all the 17 ethnic groups of Nagaland and is designed in the form of an ancient Naga village to give the feel of an authentic traditional Naga village.

Name
The name Kisama is an amalgamation of the names of its two neighbouring villages: Ki from Kigwema, sa from Phesama and ma from both.

Location
The site is located above the Asian Highway 1/National Highway 2 between Kigwema and Phesama.

References

External links

Kohima district
Tourist attractions in Kohima